Pa Maretu Ariki (1848 – 1906) was a sovereign of the Cook Islands. He was the ariki of the Pa dynasty, one of the two chiefdoms of the Takitumu tribe on the island of Rarotonga.

Early life
Pa Maretu was originally born at Aitutaki on the 15th of December 1848, his father being Mataka, a Rarotongan native, and his mother Maria, a native of Aitutaki. Shortly after his birth he was brought to Rarotonga, where he was adopted by Pa Upoko (also known as Mere Pa or Mary Pa) the daughter of Pa Te Pou Ariki and her husband Obura, who was the son of Maretu I (1802–1880), one of the first Christian converts in 1823. He was educated by Congregationalist European missionaries and taught native lore by the missionary Maretu.

Reign
Pa Maretu succeeded his adoptive mother Pa Upoko in 1895. He was appointed native missionary of Ngatangiia, and remained so until his death. He married at an early age to Pati More, a woman of high rank, but they had no children. In 1901 he visited New Zealand, accompanying Lieutenant colonel Walter Edward Gudgeon to welcome the Duke and Duchess of York to the colony. He was a member of the Federal Council of the Cook Islands and of the Rarotonga Council. He was also a native judge of the High Court and of the Land Titles Court, and took a great interest in the government of the islands. He was always of great assistance to Walter Edward Gudgeon in settling native disputes, and things in general, as he was able to view things from a European and native standpoint.

Later life
Pa Maretu retained the title until his death. He died on the 7th of February 1906 after suffering from heart and lung afflictions for some weeks, he succumbed at last very quickly. He was buried on Friday afternoon on the 9th of February, and the funeral was officially attended by the Resident Commissioner and the Government officers. He was succeeded by Pa Tetianui (also adopted by Pa Upoko) on the 16th of February 1906.

See also
History of the Cook Islands
Kingdom of Rarotonga
House of Ariki

Notes

References
Maretu. Cannibals and Converts: Radical Change in the Cook Islands, translated, annotated and edited by Marjorie Tuainekore Crocombe. (Suva: University of the South Pacific Institute of Pacific Studies, 1983) 
Gilson, Richard. The Cook Islands, 1820-1950, edited by Ron Crocombe. (Wellington: Victoria University Press; Suva: University of the South Pacific Institute of Pacific Studies, 1980)

External links

Land Tenure in the Cook Islands Takitumu: the tribe of Tangiia (NZETC)
Te Papa Museum of New Zealand collections (Photographs)
The Royal Family Lineage Tangiia-nui Takitumu

1848 births
People from Aitutaki
People from Rarotonga
Rarotongan monarchs
Royalty of the Cook Islands
Cook Island judges
Congregationalist missionaries in the Cook Islands
Adoptees
1906 deaths
Cook Island Congregationalist missionaries